Batavia City School District (BCSD) is a public school district headquartered in Batavia, New York.

Schools
 Batavia High School
 Batavia Middle School
 John Kennedy Intermediate School
 Jackson Primary School

Board of Education 
The school district is overseen by the Board of Education of Batavia City Schools, which is composed of seven duly elected members. As of 2021, the elected members of the board of education include:

References

External links
 Batavia City School District

School districts in New York (state)
Batavia, New York